Syriza Youth is the youth organisation of the Coalition of the Radical Left (Syriza) in Greece. Founded in 2013, it was a member of the European Network of Democratic Young Left (Endyl).

Formation

The Syriza Youth was founded when the largely bottom-up structure of Young Syriza groups and the Synaspismos Youth united forming a nationwide organisation.

At the founding conference on 19–22 December 2013, 522 delegates of the 128 local groups both in Greece and abroad convened in Kerameikos, Athens. The four-day conference was also attended by a number of Syriza leaders including party secretary Dimitris Vitsas and parliamentary spokesman Panagiotis Kouroumplis.

On 22 December, the delegates ratified the final text of the founding declaration on the first ballot. Inner-organisational tensions however culminated when the "Left Platform" opposed the final text arguing that it lacked a clear political position as a government of the Left should not accept any compromise with its creditors. The "Left Movement" voted blank after their "Charter of the Rights of Youth" had been rejected as an amendment by a majority of the delegates.

The delegates concluded with the election of 67 members of the organisation's first Central Council with the more pragmatic factions winning a clear majority. Four additional members remained to be appointed as honorary members.

Founding Declaration
By its founding declaration the organisation defines itself as being part of the radical left that participates in the class struggle striving to abolish all kinds of exploitation and aiming at a Socialism of the 21st century. The organisation's manifesto includes ten positions:
 Young peoples' rights
 Anti-fascism
 Alternative, non-commercial culture
 Feminism and opposition to the patriarchy
 Democratic and social rights
 Anti-racism and opposition to "Fortress Europe"
 Green politics
 Public space appropriation
 Free access to amateur sports
 A solidarity economy.

Syriza Youth upholds a quota of one third for young women to participate in all organisational bodies.

Local and international branches
Apart from branches all over Greece, the Syriza Youth also has a number of international branches in Belgium, France, Germany, the Netherlands, Sweden and the United Kingdom.

Dissolution
On 1 September 2015, 38 out of 71 members of the Syriza Youth central council, including the national secretary Elias Panteleakοs, resigned, withdrawing their support for Syriza in the forthcoming elections.

References

External links 
  

Youth wings of political parties in Greece
2013 establishments in Greece
Syriza
Youth wings of Party of the European Left member parties